Arthur Gibbon (22 August 1886 – 19 May 1968) was a British cyclist. He competed in two events at the 1912 Summer Olympics.

Gibbon also served as a corporal in the Royal Flying Corps during the First World War.

References

External links
 

1886 births
1968 deaths
British male cyclists
Olympic cyclists of Great Britain
Cyclists at the 1912 Summer Olympics
People from Folkestone
British Army personnel of World War I
Royal Flying Corps soldiers